Halorhabdus is a genus of halophilic archaea in the Haloarculaceae. With an extremely high salinity optimum of 27% NaCl, Halorhabdus has one of the highest reported salinity optima of any living organism.

References

Further reading

Scientific journals

Scientific books

Scientific databases

External links

Archaea genera
Taxa described in 2000